The Moleen Formation is a geologic formation in Nevada. It preserves fossils dating back to the Carboniferous period.

See also

 List of fossiliferous stratigraphic units in Nevada
 Paleontology in Nevada

References
 

Carboniferous geology of Nevada